The 37th Primetime Emmy Awards were held on September 22, 1985. The ceremony was broadcast on ABC, from the Pasadena Civic Auditorium, Pasadena, California.

The Cosby Show defeated two-time reigning champion Cheers to win Outstanding Comedy Series, one of three major awards it won.  Although it only took home one major award, Cheers did tie the then-record for most major nominations by a comedy series (11), set by The Mary Tyler Moore Show in 1977. In the drama field Cagney & Lacey, en route to winning four major awards on the night, defeated presumed favorite Miami Vice to win Outstanding Drama Series, four-time defending champion Hill Street Blues still received nine major nominations, but only won one award. This was Hill Street Blues 18th and final major award, setting an Emmy record for a drama series that still stands and was later achieved by The Sopranos.

The ceremony also had a memorable unscripted moment involving the arrest of impersonator Barry Bremen for grand theft while attempting to accept the Outstanding Supporting Actress in a Drama Series award on behalf of Betty Thomas, who would show up on the auditorium stage a few minutes late.

Winners and nominees

Programs

Acting

Lead performances

Supporting performances

Directing

Writing

Most major nominations
By network 
 NBC – 66
 CBS – 37
 PBS – 10

 By program
 Cheers (NBC) – 11
 Hill Street Blues (NBC) – 9
 Cagney & Lacey (CBS) / St. Elsewhere (NBC) – 7
 Miami Vice (NBC) – 6

Most major awards
By network 
 NBC – 12
 CBS – 8
 PBS – 3
 ABC – 2

 By program
 Cagney & Lacey (CBS) – 4
 The Cosby Show (NBC) / Do You Remember Love (CBS) – 3

Notes

References

External links
 Emmys.com list of 1985 Nominees & Winners
 

037
Primetime Emmy Awards
Primetime Emmy Awards
Primetime Emmy Awards